Last Man Standing is an American sitcom that premiered on ABC on October 11, 2011. Created by Jack Burditt, the series stars Tim Allen as Mike Baxter, previously a widely travelled outdoorsman but now a director of marketing at an outdoor sporting goods store in Colorado, whose home life is dominated by women: his wife Vanessa (Nancy Travis) and their three daughters Eve (Kaitlyn Dever), Mandy (Molly Ephraim for seasons 1–6 and Molly McCook from season 7 onward), and Kristin (Alexandra Krosney for season 1 and Amanda Fuller for the remaining seasons). Héctor Elizondo also stars as Ed Alzate, Mike's boss at his sporting goods store "Outdoor Man", while Christoph Sanders appears as Kyle Anderson, a young employee of Outdoor Man and Mandy's boyfriend and later husband. In 2018, Fox picked up the series for a seventh season. In April 2019, Fox renewed the series for an eighth season. In May 2020, Fox renewed the series for a ninth and final season which premiered on January 3, 2021.

Series overview

Episodes

Season 1 (2011–12)

Season 2 (2012–13) 
On May 11, 2012, ABC renewed Last Man Standing for a second season. Beginning this season, Amanda Fuller now plays Kristin, replacing Alexandra Krosney. Flynn Morrison was also added to the main cast as an age-advanced Boyd, replacing twins Evan and Luke Kruntchev. Jordan Masterson recurs as Ryan, Boyd's father, replacing Nick Jonas, who guest starred in one episode in the previous season. The second season initially received a thirteen-episode order, but ABC announced on November 12, 2012 that an additional three scripts had been ordered. The episode order was then extended to five additional episodes, taking the final total to eighteen for the season. Tim Allen's former Home Improvement co-star Richard Karn guest starred in the episode "Attractive Architect", playing the character Bill McKendree. Karn reprised his role again in the episode "The Fight". Jonathan Taylor Thomas, another Home Improvement co-star of Allen's, guest starred in the season finale, "College Girl", as the character John Baker.

Season 3 (2013–14) 
On May 10, 2013, the series was renewed for a third season, it premiered on September 20, 2013. Beginning this season, at the start of each episode a different cast member narrates that the series is recorded in front of a live studio audience. Duck Dynasty stars Willie Robertson and Si Robertson guest starred in the season premiere, "Back to School". Jonathan Taylor Thomas reprised his role as John Baker in the episodes "Ryan v. John Baker" and "Tasers". Thomas also made his directorial debut, directing the episode "Haunted House"; it was the first episode of series not directed by John Pasquin. Petty Officer First Class Raymond McKnight guest starred in the episode "Elfie".

Season 4 (2014–15) 
On May 10, 2014, ABC renewed Last Man Standing for a fourth season, which premiered on October 3, 2014. Both Jordan Masterson and Jonathan Adams were promoted to the main cast this season. Patricia Richardson, Tim Allen's former Home Improvement co-star, guest starred in the episode "Helen Potts", playing the episode's titular character. Richardson is the third Home Improvement cast member to guest star on Last Man Standing after both Richard Karn and Jonathan Taylor Thomas guest starred previously. Thomas also made a cameo appearance at the end of the "Helen Potts" episode, not as John Baker (the character he previously played on Last Man Standing), but as Helen's son Randy, a reference to his character from Home Improvement. On April 3, 2015, Allen and Héctor Elizondo guest starred on the fellow ABC sitcom Cristela as their Last Man Standing characters in the episode "Last Goose Standing", which aired after "Restaurant Opening".

Season 5 (2015–16) 
On May 10, 2015, Last Man Standing was renewed for a fifth season. At the start of this season, the practice of a cast member narrating at the start of each episode that "Last Man Standing is recorded in front of a live studio audience" is discontinued. Jay Leno guest starred as Joe Leonard, a mechanic in the episodes "The Road Less Driven", "Mike and the Mechanics" and the season finale "The Shortcut". Patricia Richardson reprised her role as Helen Potts in the episode "Tanks for the Memories". Bill Engvall guest starred in the episode "The Marriage Doctor", reuniting with his Bill Engvall Show co-star Nancy Travis.

Season 6 (2016–17)

Season 7 (2018–19)

Season 8 (2020)

Season 9 (2021)

Ratings

References

External links 
 
 

Last Man Standing (American TV series)
Last Man Standing